Novak Djokovic (born 22 May 1987) is a Serbian professional tennis player. He is currently ranked world No. 2 in men's singles by the Association of Tennis Professionals (ATP), and has been ranked world No. 1 for a record total 380 weeks, finishing as the year-end No. 1 an Open Era record seven times. He has won a total of 93 singles titles on the men's ATP Tour with titles comprising a joint-record 22 majors, a record ten Australian Opens, a record 38 Masters, a joint-record six Tour Finals, and a record 66 Big Titles. Djokovic has completed a non-calendar year Grand Slam in singles, becoming the only man in tennis history to be the reigning champion of the four majors at once across three different surfaces. He is also the first man in the Open Era to achieve a double Career Grand Slam in singles and the only player to complete the career Golden Masters in singles by winning all of the nine Masters tournaments, which he has done twice.

Djokovic began his professional career in 2003. At age 20, he disrupted Roger Federer's and Rafael Nadal's streak of 11 consecutive Grand Slam tournament victories by winning the 2008 Australian Open. At age 24, Djokovic ascended to No. 1 for the first time, winning three majors and five Masters titles in 2011. In 2015, Djokovic reached 15 consecutive finals and won a season-record 10 Big Titles. His dominant run extended through to the 2016 French Open, where he completed a non-calendar year Grand Slam and his first career Grand Slam, becoming the first man since Rod Laver in 1969 to hold all four major titles simultaneously and setting a ranking points record (16,950). Following an injury-caused decline in form in 2017, Djokovic returned to dominance at the 2018 Wimbledon Championships, sweeping three straight majors and returning to world No. 1. In 2021, Djokovic won the first three majors of the year and attempted to complete a Grand Slam at the US Open, but lost in the final to Daniil Medvedev. As of the 2023 Australian Open, Djokovic has won 10 of the last 18 majors.

Representing Serbia, Djokovic led the Serbian national team to their first Davis Cup title in 2010 and to the inaugural ATP Cup title in 2020. Moreover, he won the bronze medal for Serbia at the 2008 Beijing Olympics. Djokovic has won the Laureus World Sportsman of the Year award four times (2012, 2015, 2016, 2019), the BBC Sports Personality World Sport Star of the Year award in 2011 and the L'Équipe Champion of Champions award in 2021. He is also a recipient of the Order of St. Sava, the Order of Karađorđe's Star, and the Order of the Republika Srpska.

Beyond competition, Djokovic is an active philanthropist and a former ATP player council president. In August 2020, Djokovic and Vasek Pospisil announced the formation of the Professional Tennis Players Association as the first player-only association in tennis, citing the need for players to have more influence on the tour and advocating better prize money structure for lower-ranked players.

Early and personal life
Novak Djokovic was born on 22 May 1987 in Belgrade, SR Serbia, SFR Yugoslavia, to Dijana and Srdjan Djokovic. He is of paternal Serbian and maternal Croatian descent. His two younger brothers, Marko and Djordje, have also played professional tennis.

Djokovic began playing tennis at the age of four, after his parents gave him a mini-racket and a soft foam ball, which his father claimed became "the most beloved toy in his life". His parents then sent him to a tennis camp in Novi Sad. In the summer of 1993, as a six-year-old, he was sent to a tennis camp organized by the Teniski Klub Partizan and overseen by Yugoslav tennis player Jelena Genčić at Mount Kopaonik, where Djokovic's parents ran a fast-food parlour and a sports equipment business. Upon seeing the child Djokovic playing tennis, she stated: "This is the greatest talent I have seen since Monica Seles."

Genčić worked with young Djokovic over the following six years before realizing that, owing to his rapid development, going abroad in search of an increased level of competition was the best option for his future. To that end, she contacted Nikola Pilić and in September 1999 the 12-year-old moved to the Pilić tennis academy in Oberschleißheim, Germany, spending four years there. At the age of 14, he began his international career, winning European championships in singles, doubles, and team competition.

Djokovic is a self-described fan of languages, speaking Serbian, English, French, German, and Italian.

He met his future wife, Jelena Ristić, in high school, and began dating her in 2005. The two became engaged in September 2013, and on 10 July 2014 the couple were married on Sveti Stefan in Montenegro, while a church wedding was held in the same place, on 12 July 2014, in the Church of Saint Stephen which belongs to Praskvica Monastery. In April 2014, Djokovic announced that he and Ristić were expecting their first child. Their son was born in October 2014. Their daughter was born in 2017.

Tennis career

2000s

2001–2003: Juniors 
As a member of the Yugoslav national team, Djokovic reached the final of the 2001 Junior Davis Cup for players under 14, in which he lost his match in singles.

In juniors, he compiled a singles win-loss record of 40–11 (and 23–6 in doubles), reaching a combined junior world ranking of No. 24 in February 2004. At the junior Grand Slam tournaments his best showing was at the Australian Open where he reached the semi-finals in 2004. He also played at the French Open and US Open junior events in 2003.

2003–2005: Start of professional career 
Djokovic turned professional in 2003 by entering the ATP Tour, around the time Roger Federer and Rafael Nadal established themselves as the two dominant players in men's tennis. At the beginning of his professional career, he mainly played in Futures and Challenger tournaments, winning three of each type from 2003 to 2005. His first tour-level tournament was Umag in 2004, where he lost to Filippo Volandri in the round of 32.

Djokovic made his first Grand Slam tournament appearance by qualifying for the 2005 Australian Open, where he was defeated by eventual champion Marat Safin in the first round in straight sets, after defeating future rival Stan Wawrinka in qualifying. He went on to reach the third round of both Wimbledon and the US Open, coming back from two sets down to defeat Guillermo García López in the former, and beating Gaël Monfils and Mario Ančić in the latter. Djokovic participated in four Masters events and qualified for two of them, his best performance coming in Paris, where he reached the third round and defeated fourth seed Mariano Puerta along the way.

2006: First ATP titles
Djokovic reached the top 40 in the world singles rankings after making his first quarterfinal appearance at a Grand Slam event, coming at the French Open, and also by reaching the fourth round at Wimbledon that year.

Three weeks after Wimbledon, Djokovic won his first ATP title at the Dutch Open in Amersfoort without losing a set, defeating Nicolás Massú in the final. He won his second career title at the Moselle Open in Metz, France, and moved into the top 20. He also reached his first career Masters quarterfinal at Madrid during the indoor hardcourt season.

On 9 April 2006, Djokovic clinched a decisive Davis Cup win against Great Britain by defeating Greg Rusedski in four sets in the fourth match of the tie, giving Serbia and Montenegro an insurmountable 3–1 lead in their best-of-five series, thus keeping the country in the Group One Euro/African Zone of Davis Cup. Afterwards, Djokovic briefly considered moving from Serbia to play for Great Britain. Following this match-up, the British media spoke of Djokovic's camp negotiating with the Lawn Tennis Association about changing his international loyalty by joining British tennis ranks. The nineteen-year-old Djokovic, who was ranked sixty-third in the world at the time, mostly dismissed the story at first by saying that the talks were not serious, describing them as "the British being very kind to us after the Davis Cup." However, more than three years later, in October 2009, Djokovic confirmed that the talks between his family and the LTA throughout April and May 2006 were indeed serious:

2007: First Masters titles, first Major final and Top 3
Djokovic began 2007 by defeating Australian Chris Guccione in the final of the tournament in Adelaide, before losing in the fourth round of the Australian Open to eventual champion Roger Federer in straight sets. His performances at the Masters Series events in Indian Wells, and Miami, where he was the runner-up and champion respectively, pushed him into the world's top 10. Djokovic lost the Indian Wells final to Rafael Nadal, but defeated Nadal in Key Biscayne in the quarterfinals before defeating Guillermo Cañas for the title in the final.

After winning his first Master Series title, Djokovic returned to Serbia to help his country enter the Davis Cup World Group in a match against Georgia. He won a point by defeating Georgia's George Chanturia. Later, he played in the Monte Carlo Masters, where he was defeated by David Ferrer in the third round, and at the Estoril Open, where he defeated Richard Gasquet in the final. Djokovic then reached the quarterfinals of both the Internazionali d'Italia in Rome, where he lost to Nadal, and the Hamburg Masters, where he was defeated by Carlos Moyá. At the French Open, Djokovic reached his first major semi-final, losing to eventual champion Nadal.

At Wimbledon, Djokovic won a five-hour quarterfinal against Marcos Baghdatis. In his semi-final match against Nadal, he retired with elbow problems in the third set, after winning the first and losing the second set.

Djokovic's next tournament was the Rogers Cup in Montreal, and he defeated No. 3 Andy Roddick in the quarterfinals, No. 2 Nadal in the semi-finals, and No. 1 Federer in the final. This was the first time a player had defeated the top three ranked players in one tournament since Boris Becker in 1994. Djokovic was also only the second player, after Tomáš Berdych, to have defeated both Federer and Nadal since they became the top two players in the world. After this tournament, Björn Borg stated that Djokovic "is definitely a contender to win a Grand Slam (tournament)." The following week at the Cincinnati Masters, Djokovic lost in the second round to Moyà in straight sets. Nevertheless, he went on to reach the final of the US Open, where he had five set points in the first set and two in the second set, but lost them all before losing the match in straight sets to the top-seeded Federer.

Djokovic won his fifth title of the year at the BA-CA TennisTrophy in Vienna, defeating Stanislas Wawrinka in the final. His next tournament was the Madrid Masters, where he lost to David Nalbandian in the semi-finals. Djokovic, assured of finishing the year ranked No. 3, qualified for the year-ending Tennis Masters Cup (ATP Finals), but did not advance beyond the round robin matches. He received the Golden Badge award for the best athlete in Serbia, and the Olympic Committee of Serbia declared him the best athlete in the country.

Djokovic played a key role in the 2007 play-off win over Australia by winning all his matches and helping promote the Serbia Davis Cup team to the 2008 World Group. In Serbia's tie against Russia in Moscow in early 2008, Djokovic was sidelined due to influenza and missed his first singles match. He returned to win his doubles match, teaming with Nenad Zimonjić, before retiring during his singles match with Nikolay Davydenko.

2008: First Major title, two Masters titles, and first Year-end Championship title
Djokovic started the year by playing the Hopman Cup with fellow Serbian world No. 3 Jelena Janković. While he won all his round-robin matches, the team lost 1–2 in the final to the second-seeded American team of Serena Williams and Mardy Fish. At the Australian Open, Djokovic reached his second consecutive Grand Slam final, this time without dropping a set, including a victory over two-time defending champion Federer in the semi-finals. By reaching the semifinals, Djokovic became the youngest player in the Open Era to have reached the semifinals in all four Grand Slam events. In the final, Djokovic defeated unseeded Frenchman Jo-Wilfried Tsonga in four sets to earn his first Grand Slam singles title. This marked the first time since the 2005 Australian Open that a Grand Slam singles title was not won by Federer or Nadal.

Djokovic's next tournament was the Dubai Tennis Championships, where he lost in the semi-finals to Roddick. At the Pacific Life Masters in Indian Wells, Djokovic won his ninth career singles title, defeating Mardy Fish in the final. Djokovic won his tenth career singles title and fourth Master Series singles crown at the Italian Open in Rome after defeating Wawrinka in the final. The following week he lost to Nadal in the semi-finals at the Hamburg Masters, At the French Open, Djokovic was the third-seeded player behind Federer and Nadal. He lost to Nadal in the semi-finals in straight sets.

On grass, Djokovic once again played Nadal, this time in the Artois Championships final in Queen's Club, where he lost in two sets. Djokovic entered Wimbledon seeded third but lost in the second round to Safin, ending a streak of five consecutive majors where he had reached at least the semi-finals.

Djokovic then failed to defend his 2007 singles title at the Rogers Cup in Toronto – he was eliminated in the quarterfinals by eighth-seeded Andy Murray. The following week at the Cincinnati Masters, Djokovic advanced to the final, beating Nadal in the semifinals and thereby ending the Spaniard's 32-match winning streak. In the final, he again lost to Murray in straight sets. His next tournament was the 2008 Summer Olympics, his first Olympics. He and Nenad Zimonjić, seeded second in men's doubles, were eliminated in the first round by the Czech pairing of Martin Damm and Pavel Vízner. Seeded third in singles, Djokovic lost in the semi-finals to Nadal. Djokovic then defeated James Blake, the loser of the other semi-final, in the bronze medal match.

After the Olympics, Djokovic entered the US Open seeded third, where he defeated Roddick in the quarterfinals. To a smattering of boos in a post-match interview, Djokovic criticized Roddick for accusing him of making excessive use of the trainer during matches. His run at the US Open ended in the semi-finals when he lost to Federer in four sets, in a rematch of the previous year's final. Djokovic went on to play four tournaments after the US Open. At the Thailand Open, he lost to Tsonga in straight sets. In November, Djokovic was the second seed at the year-ending Tennis Masters Cup in Shanghai. In his first round-robin match, he defeated Argentine Juan Martín del Potro in straight sets. He then beat Nikolay Davydenko in three sets, before losing his final round-robin match against Tsonga. Djokovic qualified for the semi-finals, where he defeated Gilles Simon. In the final, Djokovic defeated Davydenko to win his first title at the year-end championship.

2009: Ten finals, five titles

Djokovic started the year at the Brisbane International, where he was upset by Ernests Gulbis in the first round. At the Sydney International, he lost to Jarkko Nieminen in the semi-finals. As defending champion at the Australian Open, Djokovic retired from his quarterfinal match with former world No. 1 Andy Roddick, primarily due to heat illness.

After losing in the semi-finals of the Open 13 tournament in Marseille to Tsonga, Djokovic won the singles title at the Dubai Tennis Championships, defeating Ferrer to claim his twelfth career title. The following week, Djokovic was the defending champion at the BNP Paribas Open in Indian Wells but lost to Roddick in the quarterfinals. At the Sony Ericsson Open in Key Biscayne, Djokovic beat Federer in the semi-finals, before losing to Murray in the final.

Djokovic reached the final of the next Masters event, the Monte-Carlo Rolex Masters on clay, losing to Nadal in the final. At the Internazionali BNL d'Italia in Rome, Djokovic failed to defend the title he had won the previous year, losing in the final.

Djokovic was the top seed at his hometown tournament, the Serbia Open in Belgrade. He defeated first-time finalist Łukasz Kubot to win his second title of the year. As third seed at the Madrid Open, Djokovic advanced to the semi-finals without dropping a set. There, he faced Nadal and lost despite holding three match points. The match, at 4 hours and 3 minutes, was the longest three-set singles match on the ATP Tour in the Open Era. At the French Open, he lost in the third round to German Philipp Kohlschreiber.

Djokovic began his grass court season at the Gerry Weber Open where after the withdrawal of Federer, he competed as the top seed. He advanced to the final, where he lost to German Tommy Haas. Djokovic then lost to Haas in the quarterfinals of Wimbledon.

During the US Open Series, Djokovic made the quarterfinals of the Rogers Cup in Montreal before losing to Roddick. At the Cincinnati Masters, Djokovic defeated third-ranked Nadal in the semi-finals before losing in the final to No. 1 Federer. At the US Open, Djokovic made the semi-finals, having dropped only two sets, defeating Ivan Ljubičić, 15th seed Radek Štěpánek and 10th seed Fernando Verdasco before being defeated by Federer.

At the China Open in Beijing, Djokovic defeated Victor Hănescu, Viktor Troicki, Verdasco, and Robin Söderling en route to the final, where he defeated Marin Čilić in straight sets to win his third title of the year. Djokovic then lost in the semi-finals of the inaugural Shanghai ATP Masters to Davydenko. At the Swiss Indoors in Basel, Djokovic defeated Jan Hernych to make it to the quarterfinals, where he recovered from a deficit to defeat Wawrinka before going on to win his semi-final against Štěpánek. In the final, he defeated home favourite and three-time defending champion Federer to win his fourth title of the year. At the last Masters event of the year at the BNP Paribas Masters in Paris, Djokovic won his first Masters title of the year by defeating Nadal in the semi-finals, before outlasting Gaël Monfils in the final.

Coming into the year-ending ATP Finals in London as the defending champion, Djokovic defeated Davydenko in his first round-robin match before losing his second match to Söderling. Despite victory over Nadal in his third round-robin match, Djokovic failed to make the semi-finals.

Djokovic ended the year as the No. 3 for the third consecutive year, having played 97 matches, the most of any player on the ATP Tour, with a 78–19 win–loss record. In addition to leading the ATP Tour in match wins, he reached a career-best ten finals, winning five titles. Djokovic also played a large role in promoting Serbia to the 2009 World Group. On 6–8 March 2010, he played a key role in bringing Serbia to the World Group quarterfinals for the first time in its independent history, winning both singles matches in the home tie against the United States against Sam Querrey and John Isner.

2010s

2010: US Open final, and Davis Cup crown 

Djokovic started his year by playing in the AAMI Classic, an exhibition event. In his first match, he defeated Haas before losing to Fernando Verdasco in his second. At the 2010 Australian Open, Djokovic lost a five-setter to Tsonga in the quarterfinals. Despite the loss, he attained a career-high ranking of No. 2 and went on to reach the semi-finals of the ABN AMRO World Tennis Tournament in Rotterdam, where he lost to Youzhny. At the Dubai Tennis Championships, Djokovic reached the final, this time defeating Youzhny to win his first title of the year.

Djokovic then took part in Serbia's Davis Cup tie against the United States on clay in Belgrade and helped his country reach its first quarterfinal in the Davis Cup with a 3–2 victory, defeating Querrey and Isner. At the Indian Wells Masters, Djokovic lost in the fourth round to Ljubičić. At the Miami Masters, he lost in his opening match to Olivier Rochus. Djokovic then announced that he had ceased working with Todd Martin as his coach.

In his first clay-court tournament of the year at the Monte-Carlo Rolex Masters, top-seeded Djokovic reached the semi-finals with wins over Wawrinka and David Nalbandian before losing to Verdasco. Djokovic again lost to Verdasco at the Internazionali BNL d'Italia in Rome, this time in the quarterfinals. As the defending champion at his hometown event, the Serbia Open in Belgrade, he withdrew in the quarterfinals while trailing Filip Krajinović.

Djokovic entered the French Open seeded third. He defeated Evgeny Korolev, Kei Nishikori, Victor Hănescu, and Robby Ginepri en route to the quarterfinals, where he lost to Jürgen Melzer in five sets. Djokovic entered Wimbledon as the third seed, defeating Rochus, Taylor Dent, Albert Montañés, Lleyton Hewitt, and Yen-Hsun Lu en route to the semi-finals, which he lost to Tomáš Berdych in straight sets.

Djokovic then competed at the Rogers Cup in Toronto, where he lost to Federer in the semi-finals. Djokovic also competed in doubles with Nadal in a one-time, high-profile partnership. This had not happened since 1976, when Jimmy Connors and Arthur Ashe as No. 1 and No. 2 paired together as a doubles team. They lost in the first round to Canadians Milos Raonic and Vasek Pospisil. Djokovic then lost to Roddick in the quarterfinals of the Cincinnati Masters.

As the third seed at the US Open, Djokovic came very close to losing in his opening round against Viktor Troicki in extreme heat. He then defeated Philipp Petzschner, James Blake, Mardy Fish, and No. 17 seed Gaël Monfils, all in straight sets, to reach the US Open semi-finals for the fourth consecutive year. There, he defeated Federer in five sets after saving two match points with forehand winners while serving to stay in the match at 4–5 in the fifth set. It was Djokovic's first victory over Federer at the US Open in four attempts, and his first victory over Federer in a Major since the 2008 Australian Open. Djokovic went on to lose to Nadal in the final, a match that saw Nadal complete his career Grand Slam.

After helping Serbia defeat the Czech Republic 3–2 to make it to the Davis Cup final, Djokovic competed at the China Open as the top seed and defending champion. He won the title for the second successive year, after defeating Maoxin Gong, Mardy Fish (walkover), Gilles Simon, and John Isner en route to the final. Djokovic then defeated Ferrer in the final. At the Shanghai Masters, Djokovic made a semi-final appearance, losing to Federer. Djokovic played his final tournament of the year at the ATP Finals in London. Djokovic was placed in Group A along with Nadal, Berdych, and Roddick. Djokovic won his first round-robin match against Berdych. He next lost to Nadal. He defeated Roddick in his final round-robin match and advanced to the semi-finals, where he lost to Federer in two sets.

Djokovic went on to win his two singles rubbers in Serbia's Davis Cup final victory over France. This started a long unbeaten run that went on into 2011. Djokovic finished the year ranked No. 3, his fourth successive finish at this position. He was awarded the title "Serbian Sportsman of the year" by the Olympic Committee of Serbia and "Serbian Athlete of the year" by DSL Sport.

Serbia progressed to the Davis Cup final, following the victories over Croatia (4–1) and the Czech Republic (3–2). Serbia came from 1–2 down to defeat France in the final tie 3–2 in Belgrade to win the nation's first Davis Cup Championship. In the final, Djokovic scored two singles points for Serbia, defeating Gilles Simon and Gaël Monfils. He was the backbone of the Serbian squad, going 7–0 in singles rubbers to lead the nation to the title, although the honour of winning the deciding rubber in the final went to compatriot Viktor Troicki.

2011: Rise to the top in one of the greatest seasons in tennis history

Djokovic won ten tournaments in 2011, including three Grand Slam tournament victories at the Australian Open, Wimbledon, and the US Open. He also captured a then-record-breaking five ATP Masters titles, and set a then-record for the most prize money won in a single season on the ATP Tour ($12 million). He held a 41-match winning streak from the start of the season to the French Open semi-finals, when he lost to Federer. Djokovic lost only two matches from the start of the season until the final match of the last Grand Slam event of the season (US Open) in September, going 10–1 against Nadal and Federer. However, his level dropped toward the season's end, beginning with a back injury sustained during the US Open which caused him to retire from the Davis Cup, and ending with a poor showing at the ATP Finals. Djokovic concluded the season with a 70–6 record and a year-end ranking of No. 1. He was named the 2011 ITF World Champion.

Pete Sampras declared Djokovic's 2011 season as the best he had seen in his lifetime, calling it "one of the best achievements in all of the sports." Boris Becker called Djokovic's season "one of the very best years in tennis of all time", noting that it "may not be the best statistically, but he's beaten Federer, he's beaten Nadal, he's beaten everybody that came around to challenge him in the biggest tournaments in the world." Rafael Nadal, who lost to Djokovic in six finals on hard, clay and grass courts, described Djokovic's performances as "probably the highest level of tennis that I ever saw."

2012: Third Australian Open title, three Masters titles, and Year-end Championship 

Djokovic began his season by winning the Australian Open. In the quarter-final, he defeated David Ferrer in three sets. In the semi-final, Djokovic beat Andy Murray in five sets after 4 hours and 50 minutes, recovering from a two-sets-to-one deficit and fending off break points at 5-all in the fifth set. In the final, Djokovic beat Rafael Nadal in five sets, recovering from a break down in the final set to win 7–5. At 5 hours and 53 minutes, the match was the longest Grand Slam final in Open Era history, as well as the longest match in Australian Open history, surpassing the 5-hour and 14-minute 2009 semi-final between Nadal and Fernando Verdasco.

Djokovic was beaten by John Isner in the semi-finals at Indian Wells. He successfully defended his title in Miami. In the Monte Carlo final, he lost in straight sets to Nadal. Djokovic also lost in straight sets to Nadal at the 2012 Rome Masters final.

Djokovic reached his maiden French Open final by defeating Roger Federer, reaching the final of all four majors consecutively. Djokovic had the chance to become the first man since Rod Laver in 1969 to hold all four major titles at once, having won last year's Wimbledon and US Open titles as well as this year's Australian Open, but was beaten by Nadal in the final in four sets. Following the French Open, Djokovic failed to defend his Wimbledon title, losing to Roger Federer in four sets in the semi-finals.

At the 2012 Summer Olympics in London, Djokovic was chosen as the flag bearer for Serbia. On 2 August 2012, Djokovic defeated French fifth seed Jo-Wilfried Tsonga and advanced to the semi-finals, where he was beaten by Murray in straight sets. In the bronze medal match he lost to Juan Martín del Potro, finishing fourth.
He successively defended his Rogers Cup title, dropping just a single set to Tommy Haas. Following the Rogers Cup, Djokovic made the final of the Cincinnati Masters but lost to Federer in straight sets.

At the US Open, Djokovic reached his third consecutive final by beating fourth-seeded David Ferrer in a match suspended a day due to rain. He then lost the final to Murray in five sets. Djokovic went on to defend his China Open title, defeating Tsonga in straight sets. The following week he won the Shanghai Masters by defeating Murray in the final. With Federer's withdrawal from the Paris Masters, Djokovic regained the No. 1 ranking. On 12 November 2012, Djokovic won the 2012 ATP Finals by defeating Federer in the final. Because of his achievements in the 2012 season, Djokovic was named the 2012 ITF World Champion in men's singles by the International Tennis Federation.

2013: Fourth Australian Open title, three Masters titles, and Year-end Championship

Djokovic began the 2013 season by defeating Andy Murray in the final of the 2013 Australian Open to win a record third consecutive Australian Open trophy and the sixth major of his career. A week later, he participated in a Davis Cup match against Belgium, where he defeated Olivier Rochus to give the Serbian team a 2–0 lead.

On 2 March 2013, Djokovic defeated Tomáš Berdych in the final of the Dubai Tennis Championships. Another solid week of tennis saw Djokovic reach the semi-finals at the BNP Paribas Open in Indian Wells, before losing to Juan Martín del Potro, ending his 22-match winning streak. The following week, Djokovic entered the Miami Masters as the defending champion, but lost in the fourth round to Tommy Haas in straight sets.

In April, Djokovic played for Serbia against the United States in the Davis Cup quarterfinals. Djokovic clinched a tie for his team by defeating John Isner and Sam Querrey. Later that month, he defeated eight-time champion Rafael Nadal in straight sets in the final of the Monte-Carlo Rolex Masters to clinch his first title in Monte Carlo. In May, he was defeated by Grigor Dimitrov in three sets in the second round of the Madrid Open in Madrid. The following week, he lost to Berdych at the quarterfinal stage of the Rome Masters.

Djokovic began his French Open campaign with wins over David Goffin, Guido Pella, and Dimitrov in straight sets. In the fourth round he recovered from a set down and defeated Philipp Kohlschreiber of Germany in four sets. In the process, he reached a 16th consecutive Grand Slam quarter-final, which he won over Tommy Haas. Djokovic then lost to Nadal in the semi-final in a five-set epic.

In the Wimbledon final, Djokovic lost to Murray in straight sets. At the Rogers Cup, he lost to Nadal in the semi-final in three sets. Later, Djokovic lost to Isner in the quarterfinals in Cincinnati. Djokovic went on to reach the US Open final, where he met Nadal for the 37th time in his career (a new Open Era record). He went on to lose in four sets. In early October, Djokovic collected his fourth Beijing title by defeating Nadal in the final in straight sets. He also collected his second Shanghai Masters title, extending his winning streak to 20–0 over the last two seasons at the hard-court Asian swing of the tour. Djokovic won his 16th Masters title in Paris at the end of the season, beating David Ferrer in the final. At the 2013 ATP Finals Djokovic retained his trophy, beating Nadal in straight sets.
At the end of the season, Boris Becker joined his staff as head coach.

2014: Second Wimbledon title, four Masters titles, and return to No. 1

Djokovic began the year with a warmup tournament win, the 2013 Mubadala Championship. At the Australian Open, he won his first four matches in straight sets against Lukáš Lacko, Leonardo Mayer, Denis Istomin, and No. 15 seed Fabio Fognini respectively. He met Wawrinka in the quarterfinals of the tournament, the second consecutive year the two had met at the event. Despite coming back from two sets to one down, Djokovic fell 9–7 in the fifth set, ending his 25–match winning streak in Melbourne, as well as his streak of 14 consecutive Grand Slam tournament semi-finals.

Djokovic won his third Indian Wells Masters title, defeating Federer in the final. Continuing his good run, he beat No. 1 Nadal in the final of the Miami Masters in straight sets. Suffering from a wrist injury which hampered him throughout the Monte-Carlo Masters, Djokovic lost the semi-finals to Federer in straight sets. After returning from injury, Djokovic won his third Rome title by beating Nadal in the final of the Italian Open. He subsequently donated the $500,000 in prize money that he had received to the victims of the 2014 Southeast Europe floods.

Djokovic reached the final of the French Open losing only two sets in six matches but lost in the final to Nadal in four sets. It was Djokovic's first defeat in the last 5 matches between both. At the Wimbledon Championships Djokovic defeated Roger Federer in the final in five sets. With this victory he replaced Rafael Nadal again as the world No. 1. Djokovic played at the Rogers Cup, losing to eventual first-time champion Jo-Wilfried Tsonga in straight sets. He followed that with a loss to Tommy Robredo at the Cincinnati Masters. At the US Open, Djokovic reached the semi-finals, where he lost in four sets to Kei Nishikori.

Djokovic returned to Beijing with a fifth trophy in six years, defeating Murray in the semi-final and Berdych in the final. The following week he was beaten by Federer in the semi-final of Shanghai Masters. He then won the Paris Bercy masters title, without losing a single set, beating Raonic in the final.

In the ATP Finals, Djokovic created a record by winning three round-robin matches with a loss of just nine games. By reaching the semi-final, he also secured the year-end No. 1 ranking for the third time, tying him with Nadal in the fifth position. He was awarded the ATP Finals trophy after Federer withdrew before the final. This marked the seventh title of the season for him and the fourth title at the year-end event.

2015: One of the greatest tennis seasons of all time 

Djokovic began the season at the Qatar Open in Doha, where he won his first two rounds for the loss of just 6 games, however, lost in the quarterfinals against Ivo Karlović in three tight sets. He rebounded from this defeat well at the Australian Open, where he made it through the first five rounds without dropping a set. In the semi-finals, he faced defending champion Stan Wawrinka, the man who beat him the previous year. He twice lost a set lead, however, came roaring back in the fifth to take it to love, and set up a third final against Andy Murray. After splitting the first two sets in tiebreakers, Djokovic found his form after dropping his serve at the start of the third set, going on to win 12 of the last 13 games to record a four-set victory over the Scot, and win an Open Era record-breaking fifth title in Melbourne, overtaking Roger Federer and Andre Agassi. He moved into equal eighth on the all-time list of men with the most Major titles, tying Agassi, Ivan Lendl, Jimmy Connors, Ken Rosewall and Fred Perry.

He next competed at the Dubai Championships and lost to Federer in the final. After 2 weeks, Djokovic defeated John Isner and Andy Murray en route to his 21st Masters title, beating Federer in three sets in Indian Wells. In Miami, he defeated David Ferrer and John Isner en route to winning his fifth title defeating Andy Murray in three sets. With his 22nd Masters title, Djokovic became the first player to complete the Indian Wells – Miami title double three times. In April, Djokovic clinched his second Monte-Carlo Masters by beating Tomáš Berdych in the final. Djokovic withdrew from the 2015 Madrid Masters. He won the title for the fourth time at the Rome Masters, making it 4 out of 4 titles in Masters events entered by Djokovic in the season.

He continued his good form on clay at the French Open by reaching the final without dropping a set in the first five rounds, including a quarterfinal clash with Nadal and a five-set semi-final victory over No. 3 seed Andy Murray which took two days to complete. This meant he became only the second man to have won against Nadal at the French Open. However, he lost the next match and the tournament to No. 8 seed Stan Wawrinka in four sets. Five weeks later, he rebounded again from the tough loss in Paris, just like 2014, coming from two sets down to beat Kevin Anderson in the fourth round, and then going on to claim his third Wimbledon title, with a four-set win over Roger Federer.

Prior to the final Grand Slam event of the year, Djokovic had the chance to become the first man in history to complete the full set of Masters titles in Cincinnati, achieving the Career Golden Masters, but he lost the final to Federer (Djokovic would accomplish the feat at the 2018 and 2020 events). At the US Open, Djokovic reached the final for the sixth time in his career, achieving the feat of reaching all four Grand Slam finals in a single calendar year. In the final, he faced Federer once again, defeating him in four sets to win his third Grand Slam title of the year, his second title at Flushing Meadows, and his tenth Grand Slam singles title overall, becoming the fifth man in the Open Era to win double-digit Grand Slam singles titles, as well as only the third man to reach all four Major finals in a calendar year.

He returned to China Open in October, winning the title for the sixth time, defeating Nadal in straight sets in the final to bring his overall record at the tournament to 29–0. Djokovic then reached the final of the Paris Masters, where he defeated Murray in straight sets, taking his fourth title there and a record sixth ATP Masters tournament in one year. After losing to Federer in the round-robin stage of the ATP Finals he took on the third seed again in the final. He beat Federer in straight sets winning his fifth ATP Finals title and becoming the first player to win the Year-end Championships four consecutive times.

By the end of the season, Djokovic made a season-record 15 consecutive finals, reaching the championship match of every top-level tournament he played (four in Majors, eight in Masters, and the final at the Year-end Championships). He won 11 titles including a season-record 10 Big Titles (three Majors, six Masters, and the Year-end Championships) on all court surfaces and conditions (hard, clay, grass and indoors). Djokovic set a season record for most ranking points (16,585) accumulated as world No. 1. and had a season-record 31 victories over top-10 players, including a remarkable 15–4 winning record against the other members of the Big Four, Federer, Nadal, and Murray. The 2015 season is Djokovic's most successful season as of 2022, and it is considered one of the greatest seasons in tennis history.

2016: Historic 'Nole Slam', four Masters titles, and ranking points record

Djokovic collected his 60th career title in Doha, defeating Rafael Nadal in two sets in a final that lasted 73 minutes. He broke his own ATP ranking points record, bringing it up to 16,790. Djokovic then proceeded to win his sixth Australian Open. On his road to his Open Era record sixth title in Melbourne, he defeated Roger Federer in four sets in the semi-finals, and in a rematch of the 2015 final, he defeated Andy Murray, in three straight sets. He quickly rebounded from an eye infection at the Dubai Open to collect a fifth Indian Wells Masters title, defeating Rafael Nadal in the semi-finals, and Milos Raonic in the final. Djokovic's run was so dominant that the world no. 2 and 3 (Andy Murray and Roger Federer) could have combined their points and still not have had enough to pass him in the rankings.

On 3 April 2016, Djokovic won the Miami Open for the third consecutive year, and did so without dropping a set en route to his sixth career Miami Open title, tying him with Andre Agassi for most ever Miami Open men's singles titles. In addition, the victory marked the fourth year Djokovic completed the Sunshine Double in his career, the most Sunshine Doubles out of any player in history, and 2016 being the third consecutive year that Djokovic completed it. His win in Miami also saw Djokovic surpass Roger Federer to become the all-time leading prize money winner on the ATP tour with career earnings of $98.2 million. After an early round exit at the Monte Carlo Masters, Djokovic quickly bounced back by winning the Madrid title for the second time in his career, with a three-set victory over Murray. They met again in the Rome Masters final one week later with Murray as the victor; despite a sluggish performance, Djokovic defeated Nadal and Kei Nishikori in two long quarterfinals and semi-finals.

Djokovic defeated Andy Murray in the final of the French Open in four sets, making him the reigning champion of all four major tournaments, a historic feat the media dubbed the Nole Slam. With his French Open triumph, Djokovic became the eighth player in history to achieve a Career Grand Slam, the third player in history after Don Budge and Rod Laver to hold all four Grand Slam titles at the same time, and the first player to win $100 million in prize money. The victory at Roland Garros brought his ATP ranking points up to a new record of 16,950. At Wimbledon, his major win streak came to an end in the third-round when he lost to American Sam Querrey in four sets. It was his earliest exit in a Grand Slam since the 2009 French Open.

In late July, Djokovic returned to form by winning his fourth Rogers Cup title, and 30th Masters title overall, without dropping a set. In August, Djokovic was beaten in the first round of the Olympic men's singles in Rio de Janeiro by Juan Martín del Potro. It was Djokovic's first opening round defeat since January 2009, when Ernest Gulbis defeated him at the 2009 Brisbane International. In the final slam of the year, the US Open, Djokovic advanced to the final but was defeated by Stan Wawrinka in four sets. Djokovic was defeated by Roberto Bautista Agut and Marin Čilić in the semi-finals and quarterfinals of Shanghai and Paris. Due to this result, he lost the No. 1 ranking to Andy Murray. However, a runner-up finish at the ATP Finals indicated his best performances in nearly three months. After the season, he parted ways with his coach of three years, Boris Becker.

2017: Split with team and long injury hiatus 

In January, Djokovic defended his title in Doha after defeating the new world No. 1 Andy Murray. At the Australian Open, he was upset in the second round by world No. 117 Denis Istomin. This was the first time since 2007 that Djokovic failed to reach the quarterfinals at the Australian Open, and the first time in his career that he lost to a player ranked outside of the top 100 at a major. In February and March, Djokovic played at the Mexican Open and Indian Wells Masters, but was eliminated by Nick Kyrgios in both events before the semifinals. In April, Djokovic reached the quarterfinals of the Monte-Carlo Masters, losing to David Goffin. After the tournament, he chose to split with his long-time coach Marián Vajda, fitness specialist Gebhard Phil-Gritsch, and physiotherapist Miljan Amanović, citing the need to find a winning spark. A better showing at the Madrid Masters saw Djokovic reach the semifinals, losing to Nadal in straight sets. A runner-up result at the Rome Masters indicated improvement in his form.

On 21 May 2017, Djokovic announced that Andre Agassi would become his new coach, starting at the 2017 French Open. However, as the defending champion, he lost in the quarterfinals to Dominic Thiem. He began the grass court season at the Eastbourne International, playing his first non-Wimbledon tournament on grass since 2010. He won the title by beating Gaël Monfils in the final. He made it to the quarterfinals at Wimbledon before retiring against Tomáš Berdych due to an elbow injury.

On 26 July, Djokovic announced he would miss the US Open and the rest of the 2017 season to recover from his elbow injury.

2018: Surgery and resurgence; two Major titles, return to No. 1, and historic Career Golden Masters 

In January, Djokovic defeated Dominic Thiem at the Kooyong Classic exhibition tournament. At the 2018 Australian Open, he reached the fourth round, where he was upset by Chung Hyeon. In late January, he underwent surgery on his elbow. On 3 March, Djokovic returned to the practice courts, and surprisingly played at Indian Wells only a week later, losing in the second round to Taro Daniel. He then lost to Benoît Paire in the second round of the Miami Open.

Reuniting with longtime coach Marián Vajda at the Monte Carlo Masters, Djokovic collected victories over Dušan Lajović and Borna Ćorić, followed by a loss to Dominic Thiem. In a press conference, he stated, "After two years finally I can play without pain." After another early exit in Barcelona to Martin Kližan, Djokovic's gradual return to form would appear at the Madrid Masters. With a first round win over Kei Nishikori, Djokovic achieved his first victory over a top 20 player in 10 months; however, he lost in the second round to Kyle Edmund. Going into the Rome Masters with a 6–6 season record, he reached the semifinals before losing to long-time rival Rafael Nadal. He then reached the quarterfinals of the French Open before losing to Marco Cecchinato.

Djokovic began the grass court season at Queen's Club, securing his first win over a top 5 player in almost 18 months by defeating Grigor Dimitrov in the second round. He reached the final where, despite holding a championship point, he lost to Marin Čilić. He also played doubles partnering with longtime friend and rival Stan Wawrinka. Djokovic then entered Wimbledon as the 12th seed, where he reached the semifinals to face Rafael Nadal. Djokovic defeated Nadal in a 5-hour and 17-minute, five-set match spread over two days. In the final, he claimed his fourth Wimbledon title and 13th major title overall by defeating Kevin Anderson in straight sets. With the win, he rose 11 ranking spots and re-entered the top 10 for the first time since October 2017.

After a triumphant grass season, Djokovic started his North American hardcourt swing with a third-round showing at the Rogers Cup, losing to Stefanos Tsitsipas. Afterwards, he returned to play the Cincinnati Masters for the first time in three years. In an event plagued by suspended play due to rain, Djokovic defeated the defending champion Grigor Dimitrov, Milos Raonic, and Marin Čilić to reach his sixth final at the tournament and fourth final against Roger Federer. Although Federer was riding a streak of 100 consecutive holds of serve at the tournament, Djokovic broke his serve three times to win his first Cincinnati Masters title. With this victory, Djokovic became the first (and, as of 2022, only) player in tennis history to complete the Career Golden Masters — winning all nine ATP Masters events at least once in one's career.

Djokovic was the sixth seed at the US Open. He advanced to his eleventh US Open semifinal in as many appearances, where he overcame Kei Nishikori. Djokovic then defeated Juan Martín del Potro to win his third US Open title and 14th major title overall, tying Pete Sampras' tally. With the win, Djokovic returned to the top 3 in the world rankings for the first time since the 2017 French Open.

At the Shanghai Masters, Djokovic defeated Kevin Anderson and Alexander Zverev en route to the title, not dropping a set nor having his serve broken throughout. The win marked his fourth Shanghai title, and his ranking rose to No. 2. On 31 October, Rafael Nadal announced his withdrawal from the Paris Masters due to an abdominal injury, and Djokovic reclaimed the world No. 1 ranking. There, Djokovic defeated Roger Federer in a tight three-set semifinal, but was upset by the unseeded Karen Khachanov in the final. At the ATP Finals, Djokovic was guaranteed a fifth year-end No. 1 ranking following the withdrawal of Rafael Nadal from the event. In the round-robin stage, he defeated Alexander Zverev, Marin Čilić, and John Isner without dropping a set. In the semifinals, he defeated Kevin Anderson to reach his seventh final at the tournament but was upset by Zverev. At the 2018 Mubadala Championship, he scored victories over Karen Khachanov & Kevin Anderson to win the title.

2019: Historic 7th Australian Open title and 5th Wimbledon title

Djokovic's first tournament of the year was at the Qatar Open, where he lost to Roberto Bautista Agut in the semifinals. He then entered the Australian Open as the top seed, and defeated Rafael Nadal in the final to win his record seventh Australian Open and 15th major title overall. Djokovic then played at the Indian Wells Masters, where he was upset by Philipp Kohlschreiber in the third round, and lost in the fourth round of the Miami Open to Bautista Agut.

Djokovic then began his clay court season at the Monte Carlo Masters, losing in the quarterfinals to Daniil Medvedev. During the Madrid Open, Novak Djokovic celebrated his 250th week at world number 1 in ATP rankings. By beating Stefanos Tsitsipas in the final, Djokovic claimed his third Madrid Open title and record-equaling 33rd ATP Masters title overall.
At the Italian Open, he reached the final after a brutal victory over long time rival Juan Martín del Potro, where he lost to Rafael Nadal. Djokovic competed in the French Open, reaching the semifinals without dropping a set. His fourth-round win made him the first man to reach 10 consecutive quarterfinals at Roland Garros. In the semifinals, he lost to Dominic Thiem in a four-hour, five-set match stretched across two days, ending his 26-match winning streak in majors and his search for a second 'Nole Slam".

At Wimbledon, Djokovic defended his title to win his fifth Wimbledon title and 16th major title overall, defeating Roger Federer in an epic five-set final that lasted a record four hours and fifty-seven minutes. Djokovic, who won fewer points overall than Federer, saved two championship points in the fifth set to win the title. Djokovic next played at the Cincinnati Open as the defending champion, but lost to eventual champion Daniil Medvedev in the semifinals. As the defending champion at the 2019 US Open, Djokovic lost to Stan Wawrinka in the fourth round, retiring due to injury whilst trailing by 2 sets and a break. In October, Djokovic defeated John Millman in straight sets to win the Japan Open. At the Shanghai Masters, Djokovic reached the quarterfinal stage, but lost to Stefanos Tsitsipas. In November, Djokovic won his fifth Paris Masters title over Denis Shapovalov. Djokovic then played at the 2019 ATP Finals but was eliminated in the round robin stage after losses to Dominic Thiem and Federer (his first loss to Federer since 2015).

2020s

2020: ATP Cup crown, 8th Australian Open title, and the double Golden Masters

At the inaugural 2020 ATP Cup, Djokovic led Serbia to the title by scoring six victories, including wins over Daniil Medvedev in the semifinals and Rafael Nadal in the final. At the Australian Open, he defeated longtime rival Roger Federer in straight sets en route to the final where he overcame Dominic Thiem in five sets. This marked Djokovic's eighth win at the Australian Open and 17th Grand Slam title. He also regained the world No. 1 spot in the ATP rankings. Djokovic then won the title at Dubai Tennis Championships for the fifth time, defeating Stefanos Tsitsipas in the final. In June, Djokovic tested positive for COVID-19 during the Adria Tour, a series of charity exhibition games in Balkans that he helped organize. Djokovic was criticized for holding the event with a lack of social distancing and other precautions taken against COVID-19. The last match of the tour was cancelled after several players, their partners, and coaches tested positive for the virus. Djokovic stated he was "deeply sorry", admitting he and organisers "were wrong" to go ahead with the event and that they believed the tournament met all health protocols. He also said that many of the criticisms were malicious, adding: "It's obviously more than just criticism, it's like an agenda and a witch hunt".

With the resumption of the ATP Tour, Djokovic defeated Milos Raonic to win his second Cincinnati Masters title. By doing so, he won his 35th Masters title, completing his second career Golden Masters. In the fourth round of the US Open, Djokovic was defaulted after accidentally hitting a line official in the throat with a tennis ball during his fourth round match against Pablo Carreño Busta. The United States Tennis Association docked Djokovic all ranking points he would have earned at the tournament and fined him the prize money that he would have won had the incident not occurred. On 21 September, Djokovic moved past Pete Sampras for the second highest number of weeks spent as the ATP world number 1 ranked player.

Djokovic next won a record 36th Masters 1000 title and his fifth in Rome, defeating Diego Schwartzman in the final. At the rescheduled French Open, Djokovic lost in straight sets to Rafael Nadal in the final. Djokovic then played at the Vienna Open, where he was upset in the quarterfinals by Lorenzo Sonego in straight sets. In the ATP Finals, Djokovic lost to Daniil Medvedev in the round robin, but defeated Alexander Zverev and Diego Schwartzman. He then lost his semifinal match to Dominic Thiem. On 21 December, Djokovic reached his 300th career week as the number 1 ranked singles tennis player.

2021: 9th Australian Open, 2nd French, 6th Wimbledon, double Career Slam & record weeks at No. 1 

Djokovic began his 2021 season by playing for Serbia as the defending champions in the ATP Cup, but the nation was eliminated in the group stage despite Djokovic winning both his singles matches. He then went on to win his 18th major title and record-extending ninth title at the Australian Open, over Daniil Medvedev in the final. On 1 March, Djokovic equaled Federer's Open Era record of 310 weeks at world No. 1, and subsequently surpassed it. As of 23 May 2022 the weeks at number one stands at 371. Djokovic next played at the Monte Carlo Masters, where he lost his third round match to Dan Evans. Djokovic then played at the Serbia Open, losing a lengthy three-set semifinal to Aslan Karatsev. At the Italian Open, Djokovic defeated Stefanos Tsitsipas and Lorenzo Sonego, but lost in a three-set final to Rafael Nadal.

At the French Open, Djokovic advanced to the final after defeating Rafael Nadal in a four-set semifinal epic. It marked only Nadal's second loss to Djokovic (and third loss overall) at the event. In the final, Djokovic came back from two sets down to defeat Stefanos Tsitsipas in five sets. He became the first player in the Open Era to win a Major after coming back from a two-set deficit in two separate matches; Djokovic also became only the third man to win all four singles majors twice, and the first to do so in the Open Era.

At the 2021 Wimbledon Championships, Djokovic recorded the 100th grass-court win by reaching the semifinals, and defeated Matteo Berrettini in the final to claim his sixth Wimbledon title and equal Federer and Nadal's all-time record of 20 men's singles major titles. Djokovic became the second player to win Majors on three different surfaces in the same year (after Nadal in 2010) and the fifth man in the Open Era to achieve the "Channel Slam", winning the French Open and Wimbledon in the same year. Djokovic opened his summer hard court season at the Tokyo Olympics, where he sought to improve on his bronze medal result from Beijing 2008. However, he lost in the semifinals to Alexander Zverev, and then to Pablo Carreño Busta in the bronze medal match. Djokovic also competed in mixed doubles partnering Nina Stojanović; the pair lost in the semifinals to Aslan Karatsev and Elena Vesnina, then withdrew from their bronze medal match against WTA singles No. 1 Ashleigh Barty and John Peers, with Djokovic citing a shoulder injury.

Djokovic then entered the US Open vying to be the third man in history to achieve the Grand Slam in men's singles. In the third round, Djokovic faced Kei Nishikori and lost the first set, but won the next three sets to advance; he repeated this pattern against Jenson Brooksby and Matteo Berrettini. In the semifinals, he defeated Alexander Zverev in five sets, to advance to his record-equaling 31st major final. There, he faced Daniil Medvedev but lost in straight sets, ending his chances of achieving the Grand Slam.

At the Paris Masters, Djokovic defeated Hubert Hurkacz to reach the final, which secured the year-end No. 1 ranking for the seventh time, breaking Pete Sampras' all-time record. In the final, he avenged his US Open loss to Daniil Medvedev to win his sixth Paris Masters title and record 37th ATP Masters 1000 title overall. At the 2021 ATP Finals, Djokovic was defeated in the semifinals by Zverev. Djokovic finished the season by leading Serbia to the semifinals of 2021 Davis Cup Finals, where they lost to Croatia.

2022: Australia controversy, record 38 Masters, 7th Wimbledon, record tying 6th ATP Finals

Djokovic was set to begin his 2022 season by participating in the ATP Cup in Sydney but pulled out. In order to play at the Australian Open, where he was a three-time defending champion, the Victorian Government required all players to be vaccinated against COVID-19 or have a medical exemption. Djokovic was one of "a handful" of players and staff to be granted a medical exemption by Tennis Australia and the Department of Health in Victoria. It was later revealed that Djokovic tested positive for COVID-19 on 16 December 2021 which was used as the basis for his exemption.

Djokovic had been granted a visa to enter Australia on 18 November 2021. He travelled to Melbourne on 5 January but was detained by the Australian Border Force after they determined that he did not meet the entry requirements for an unvaccinated traveller. Djokovic disclosed that a member of his support team ticked a box on his application form stating he had not travelled abroad two weeks before he left for Australia; however, he had been to Spain at that time. His visa was cancelled and he was held in an immigration detention hotel for several days awaiting a court hearing.

On 10 January, the Federal Circuit and Family Court of Australia ordered his release and awarded costs, ruling that the visa cancelation process undertaken by Australian border officials was flawed on the basis that they did not give Djokovic sufficient time to contact his lawyers and tennis authorities before his official interview. The Australian Government conceded that the cancelation was "unreasonable in [the] circumstances".

On 14 January 2022, Alex Hawke, Australia's Minister for Immigration, Citizenship, Migrant Services and Multicultural Affairs, exercised his ministerial powers under sections 133C(3) and 116(1)(e)(i) of the Migration Act 1958 to cancel Djokovic's visa, citing "health and good order grounds, on the basis that it was in the public interest to do so". Djokovic applied for a judicial review, but three Federal Court of Australia judges unanimously dismissed his application on 16 January, preventing his participation in the 2022 Australian Open. Djokovic said he was "extremely disappointed" with the decision but accepted the ruling, and flew out of Australia to Dubai that night. Because he was removed using ministerial powers under the Migration Act, he is now barred from returning to Australia for three years, although each visa application is reviewed on its merits. As of November 2022, this visa ban has been overturned by the recently elected Immigration Minister Andrew Giles.

In February, Djokovic gave an interview to the BBC regarding his deportation from Australia, stating he is willing to forego career records by sticking to his principles of free choice and not having the COVID-19 vaccine. In May, he admitted that the court battle and his deportation from Australia "took a major toll" on him. He said: "The amount of pressure and everything that I was feeling in the first few months of the year, as much as I've felt pressure in my life and my career, that was something really on a whole different level".

Djokovic entered the Dubai Championships in February, where vaccination was not required for entry. He was upset in the quarterfinals by Jiří Veselý, resulting in him conceding his world No. 1 ranking to Daniil Medvedev. This marked the first time a man outside of the Big Four was ranked singles world No. 1 since Andy Roddick in February 2004. Djokovic withdrew from both the Indian Wells Masters and the Miami Open, due to the United States forbidding unvaccinated foreign travellers. Despite being unable to play, Djokovic regained the world No. 1 ranking after Medvedev's third-round defeat at Indian Wells.

After being unable to play in March, Djokovic began his clay court season at the Monte-Carlo Masters in April, seeded first. He received a bye in the first round and lost to Alejandro Davidovich Fokina in the second, his first opening match loss since the 2018 Barcelona Open. In April, he made it to the final of the Serbia Open, but lost to Andrey Rublev in three sets. At the Madrid Open in May, Djokovic made it to the semifinals where he was beaten by 19 year old and eventual champion Carlos Alcaraz.
At the Italian Open a week later, he reached the twelfth final of his career at this Masters. In the semifinals, he defeated Casper Ruud for his 1,000th career win, becoming only the fifth man in the Open Era to reach this milestone. In the final, he defeated Stefanos Tsitsipas to win his sixth Italian Open and 38th Masters title.

Djokovic entered the French Open in May as the defending champion. After defeating Yoshihito Nishioka, Alex Molčan, Aljaž Bedene and Diego Schwartzman in straight sets, he faced Rafael Nadal in the quarterfinals for their record-extending 59th meeting. He lost in four sets, ending his French Open title defense. As a result of his quarterfinals defeat, he conceded the No. 1 ranking to Daniil Medvedev for the second time in 2022.

With his first-round win at the 2022 Wimbledon Championships against Kwon Soon-woo, Djokovic became the first player in history (male or female) to win 80 matches at all four Grand Slams. With his semifinal win over Cameron Norrie, Djokovic reached a record 32nd Grand Slam final, one ahead of Roger Federer. Djokovic went on to defeat Nick Kyrgios in the final in four sets for his fourth consecutive and seventh overall Wimbledon trophy.
With this victory, he reached a total of 21 major titles, which broke his tie of 20 majors with Federer and put him one Grand Slam title behind Nadal.

Due to Djokovic's unvaccinated status against COVID-19, he was unable to compete in the US Open as the US Government did not allow unvaccinated non-US citizens to enter the country. As a result, he withdrew from the tournament on 25 August. At the 2022 Astana Open he defeated Medvedev in the semifinals. He won his 90th singles trophy defeating Stefanos Tsitsipas in the final. Djokovic also qualified for the 2022 ATP Finals for the 15th time. 

At his next tournament, the 2022 Rolex Paris Masters, he reached his 90th Masters quarterfinal defeating Karen Khachanov, who was the only player to defeat him in the final of this Masters. He powered into his 74th Masters 1000 semifinal and eighth at this tournament with a straight sets win over Lorenzo Musetti. He reached his third straight final for the season and eighth overall at this Masters defeating Stefanos Tsitsipas. It was also Djokovic's record 56th ATP Masters 1000 final and the 650th hard-court win of his career, making him just the third male in the Open Era to record 650 or more career wins on any single surface. He lost in the final to teenager Holger Rune. It was the first time Djokovic lost in 31 Masters 1000 finals when he won the first set.

Seeded seventh at the 2022 ATP Finals, Djokovic won his first round robin match over second seed Stefanos Tsitsipas recording his 60th win over top-3 players, making him the first man to accomplish this milestone since the ATP rankings begin in 1973. It was also his ninth straight win over Tsitsipas. Next he defeated sixth seed Andrey Rublev and fourth seed Daniil Medvedev to reach the semifinals. He reached his eighth final at this event defeating Taylor Fritz to secure his 15th year-end top-5 finish in the rankings. He defeated Casper Ruud to win a record-tying sixth ATP Finals title. He is also the first player ever to win the ATP Finals in three different decades—the 2000s, 2010s and 2020s. Djokovic, at the age of 35, also became the oldest champion in ATP Finals' 53-year history.

2023: 10th Australian Open, records tying 22nd Major title and breaking 378 weeks at No. 1

Djokovic kicked off his season by winning his 92nd career title at the 2023 Adelaide International 1, where he defeated Sebastian Korda in three sets in the final after saving a championship point. He then played an exhibition event playing against Nick Kyrgios the following week despite hamstring injury concerns. At the Australian Open, Djokovic dropped only one set en route to the final, where he defeated Stefanos Tsitsipas in straight sets to claim his record-extending 10th Australian Open title while tying Nadal for the Open Era record of 22 men's singles major titles and reclaiming the world No. 1 ranking from Carlos Alcaraz. On 20 February 2023, Djokovic tied Steffi Graf's record for most weeks as World No. 1 that she set back 25 years ago in March of 1997. The following week on 27 February he broke the record with 378 weeks at No. 1, the most of any male tennis player in the Open Era.

Djokovic was forced to withdraw from the 2023 BNP Paribas Open in Indian Wells after being denied a visa into the United States due to being unvaccinated. Florida Governor Ron DeSantis made a direct appeal to US President Joe Biden to grant Djokovic a visa for the 2023 Miami Open despite being unvaccinated.

Rivalries

Djokovic has a winning record against most of his top contemporaries, including his fellow Big Three counterparts, Roger Federer and Rafael Nadal.

Rafael Nadal 

Djokovic and Rafael Nadal have met 59 times including in all four major finals, an Open-Era record for head-to-head meetings between male players. Djokovic leads 30–29. Djokovic leads on hard courts 20–7 while Nadal leads on clay 20–8, and they are tied on grass 2–2. They have played a record 18 major matches with Nadal winning 11, and a joint-record nine major tournament finals (tied with Federer–Nadal) with Nadal winning five. Djokovic is the first player to have at least ten match wins against Nadal and the only person to defeat Nadal seven times consecutively, which he did twice. The two share the record for the longest major final match ever played (5 hours and 53 minutes) at the 2012 Australian Open final.

Roger Federer

Djokovic played Roger Federer in his first major final at the 2007 US Open and lost in straight sets. They met 50 times (not including one occasion when there was a walkover in favour of Djokovic), with Djokovic winning 27 of them. He leads on hard courts 20–18 as well as on grass 3–1; they are split 4–4 on clay.

Djokovic had more wins against Federer than any other player. They have played 17 major matches with Djokovic winning 11. Other than Nadal, Djokovic is the only player to defeat Federer in consecutive major tournament matches. Federer ended Djokovic's 41-match winning start to the 2011 season at the 2011 French Open semifinals. However, Federer lost to Djokovic in straight sets the following year.
Federer's last major final was against Djokovic at the 2019 Wimbledon Championships. Djokovic won in five sets with the final set going to a tiebreak, in what became the longest final in Wimbledon history. Their last encounter was at the semifinals of the 2020 Australian Open; Djokovic won in straight sets.

Andy Murray

Djokovic and Andy Murray have met 36 times, with Djokovic leading 25–11. Djokovic leads 5–1 on clay, 20–8 on hard courts, and Murray leads 2–0 on grass. The two are almost exactly the same age, with Murray being a week older than Djokovic. They went to training camp together, and Murray won the first match they ever played as teenagers. The pair have met 19 times in finals, which Djokovic leads 11–8. Ten of the finals were Masters finals, where they are tied at 5–5. Their most notable match in this category was a three-set thriller at the final of the 2012 Shanghai Masters, in which Murray held five championship point opportunities in the second set; however, Djokovic saved each of them, forcing a deciding set. He eventually prevailed to win his first Shanghai Masters title, ending Murray's 12–0 winning streak at the event. This, and the three-set match they played in Rome in 2011, were voted the ATP Tour match of the Year, for each respective season. They have also met in seven major finals, with Djokovic winning five of them.

Stan Wawrinka
Djokovic and Stan Wawrinka have met 26 times with Djokovic leading 20–6. However, the two have contested numerous close matches, including four five-setters at the majors. Wawrinka and Djokovic have met in three consecutive Australian Opens – with each match going to five sets – and a five-setter in the US Open. In the 2013 Australian Open fourth round, Djokovic won 12–10 in a fifth set; at the 2013 US Open semifinals Djokovic won 6–4 in the fifth set; at the 2014 Australian Open quarterfinals, Wawrinka won 9–7 in the fifth. Wawrinka's win broke Djokovic's run of 14 consecutive major semifinals, and ended a 28-match winning streak; and Wawrinka went on to win his first major title at the tournament. Djokovic got revenge the next year at the 2015 Australian Open, winning 6–0 in the fifth set.

At the 2015 French Open final, Wawrinka defeated Djokovic in four sets to claim his second major title. Later that year, Djokovic beat Wawrinka at the Cincinnati Masters and Paris Masters. At the 2016 US Open, Wawrinka beat Djokovic in a major final for a second time.

Despite Djokovic's 20–6 overall record against Wawrinka, Wawrinka leads Djokovic 3–2 in ATP finals (2–0 in major finals). During Djokovic's run of 13 major finals from the 2014 Wimbledon Championships through the 2020 Australian Open, his only two losses were to Wawrinka. Contrary to most high-profile rivalries, the pair have also played doubles together.

Juan Martín del Potro
Djokovic and Juan Martín del Potro met 20 times, with Djokovic leading 16–4. Djokovic won their first four meetings, before back-to-back victories for del Potro at the 2011 Davis Cup and their Bronze medal match at the 2012 Summer Olympics in straight sets. Djokovic won the next four matches before he lost to del Potro at the 2013 Indian Wells Masters, where the Argentine made his second career Masters final. Djokovic got the upper hand on the rivalry once again by winning two of the most important matches between them to date; an epic five-setter at the 2013 Wimbledon Championships semifinals (which was the longest Wimbledon semifinal at the time), and a thrilling three-setter at the 2013 Shanghai Masters final. Del Potro upset Djokovic in the first round at the 2016 Rio Olympics in Rio en route to the final. In 2018, Djokovic defeated del Potro in three close sets in the final of the US Open, which was the first Grand Slam final for del Potro since his 2009 US Open victory. They played their last match at the 2019 Italian Open quarterfinal which Djokovic won in a dramatic three-setter after saving two match points.

Jo-Wilfried Tsonga
Djokovic and Jo-Wilfried Tsonga met 23 times, with Djokovic leading 17–6. Their first meeting was in the final of the 2008 Australian Open, which Djokovic won in four sets to win his first major singles title.

Their next meeting at the majors was at the 2010 Australian Open in the quarterfinals. This time Tsonga prevailed, winning in five sets after Djokovic fell ill during the match. It would be another year-and-a-half until they met again, this time in the semifinals at Wimbledon in 2011. It was their first meeting on grass, and Djokovic prevailed in four sets to advance to his first Wimbledon final (and claiming the world No. 1 ranking for the first time in the process). At the 2012 French Open, Djokovic and Tsonga met again in the quarterfinals, with Djokovic prevailing in five sets after over four hours.

They met again two months later at the Olympics, with Djokovic winning in straight sets in the quarterfinals. They contested the final of the 2012 China Open, where Djokovic was victorious once again, in straight sets. The pair were drawn in the same pool for the 2012 ATP Finals in which Djokovic prevailed in the first (of three) round robin matches. It was Djokovic's fifth win over Tsonga in 2012. Their final major meeting was in the second round of the 2019 Australian Open, which Djokovic won in straight sets.

Daniil Medvedev
Djokovic and Daniil Medvedev have met 14 times, with Djokovic leading 9–5. They have contested two major finals, with Djokovic winning the 2021 Australian Open and Medvedev winning his first major title at the 2021 US Open, also ending Djokovic's quest for a calendar-year Grand Slam.

Djokovic won their first two matches at the 2017 Davis Cup and 2017 Aegon International Eastbourne. They next met at a major for the first time in the fourth round of the 2019 Australian Open, with Djokovic prevailing in four sets. Medvedev improved their head-to-head to 3–2 with three-set wins at the quarterfinal of the 2019 Monte-Carlo Masters and the semifinal of 2019 Western & Southern Open, the latter of which Medvedev went on to win for his maiden ATP Masters 1000 title. They met in three finals in 2021, with Djokovic winning the Australian Open and Paris Masters and Medvedev winning the US Open.

Medvedev replaced Djokovic as the world No. 1 player when he rose to the top ranking for the first time in February 2022.

Stefanos Tsitsipas
Djokovic and Stefanos Tsitsipas have met 13 times, with Djokovic leading 11–2, including at the 2021 French Open and 2023 Australian Open finals, both of which Djokovic won.

Their first meeting took place at the third round of the 2018 Rogers Cup, with the then 19-year-old Tsitsipas, ranked No. 27, pulling an upset over Djokovic in three sets. Djokovic avenged this loss by beating Tsitsipas, then ranked in the top 10, in straight sets to win the 2019 Mutua Madrid Open. Tstisipas won their next match in the quarterfinals of the 2019 Rolex Shanghai Masters in three sets to bring their head-to-head to 2–1 in his favor. Djokovic then won all of their next ten matches, including the 2020 French Open semifinal, 2021 French Open final, 2021 Italian Open final, and 2023 Australian Open final, the last of which also saw the two competing for the world No. 1 ranking.

Legacy
Some observers, tennis players and coaches describe Djokovic as the greatest of all time, primarily because he won tournaments by beating the top players in the world and having better head-to-head records against his biggest rivals in one of the strongest eras of tennis, collecting the most weeks at No. 1, winning the most Big Titles, beating the top 10 and top 5 players the most, finishing the most years at No. 1 while winning all Grand Slam and Masters events at least twice, which has never been done by another player even once. Djokovic is credited with beating more higher-ranked players on the way to his Grand Slam tournament trophies than anyone among the big three. Former world's number 1 Daniil Medvedev labelled Novak Djokovic the "greatest tennis player in history" after winning his first major title at the 2021 US Open against Djokovic. Pat Cash emphasized that Djokovic is one of two players who beat Rafael Nadal at the French Open, which he considers to be "the biggest challenge in tennis". Richard Krajicek and The Roar, sports opinion website, said that Djokovic should be considered for the greatest player of all time because he is the only one among his greatest rivals who has won four Grand Slams in a row. Patrick Mouratoglou stated, "Novak is the most complete player of all times. That enables him to find the solution to most of the problems on court and this, on every surface. It explains why he is now in the best position to become the GOAT".

Djokovic is widely considered to be one of the greatest returners in the history of the sport, an accolade given to him even by Andre Agassi, who was considered to be the best returner ever. Though staying clear of best ever conversations, tennis coach Nick Bollettieri has continually been praising Djokovic as the "most complete player ever" and the "most perfect player of all time":

Pete Sampras, who at the time of his retirement in 2003 was considered by some to be the greatest male tennis player of all time, stated unequivocally after Djokovic picked up his record-breaking seventh year-end No. 1 in 2021:

Tennis pundits have classified many of Djokovic's matches as some of the greatest contests ever, in particular the 2012 Australian Open final in which he beat Rafael Nadal. Some analysts claim that the Djokovic–Nadal rivalry ranks as the best rivalry in tennis history because of the quality of matches they produce.

Playing style and equipment
Djokovic is an aggressive baseline player. His groundstrokes from both wings are consistent, deep, and penetrating. His backhand is widely regarded as one of the best in today's game, due to its effectiveness on both sides of the court. His best shot is his backhand down the line, with great pace and precision. He excels at returning serve in particular, and regularly ranks among the tour leaders in return points, return games, and break points won. After great technical difficulties during the 2009 season (coinciding with his switch to the Head racket series), his serve is one of his major weapons again, winning him many free points; his first serve is typically hit flat, while he prefers to slice and kick his second serves wide. He has also led the ATP Tour in their career "Under Pressure Rating" statistic, in part because of his prowess at winning deciding sets.

Djokovic has been described as one of the fittest and most complete athletes in sports history, with high agility, court coverage and mobility, which allows him to hit winners from seemingly indefensible positions. Because of this, coupled with flexibility and length, he rarely gets aced. Todd Martin, who coached Djokovic between 2009 and 2010, noted that:

Djokovic's return of serve is a powerful weapon for him, with which he can be both offensive and defensive. He is highly efficient off both the forehand and backhand return, often getting the return in play deep with pace, neutralizing the advantage the server usually has in a point. Occasionally, Djokovic employs a well-disguised backhand underspin drop shot and sliced backhand. His smash is considered to be one of his biggest weaknesses, being prone to making mistakes on the shot in big moments such as the 2008 Olympics.

Djokovic commented on the modern style of play, including his own, in an interview with Jim Courier after his semi-final win against Andy Murray in the 2012 Australian Open tournament:

Entering the pro circuit, Djokovic used the Head Liquidmetal Radical, but changed sponsors to Wilson in 2005. He could not find a Wilson racquet he liked, so Wilson agreed to make him a custom racquet to match his previous one with Head. After the 2008 season, Djokovic re-signed with Head, and debuted a new paint job of the Head YouTek Speed Pro at the 2009 Australian Open. He then switched to the Head YouTek IG Speed (18x20) paint job in 2011, and in 2013, he again updated his paint job to the Head Graphene Speed Pro, which included an extensive promotional campaign. Djokovic uses a hybrid of Head Natural Gut (gauge 16) in the mains and Luxilon Big Banger ALU Power Rough (gauge 16L) in the crosses. He also uses Head Synthetic Leather Grip as a replacement grip. In 2012, Djokovic appeared in a television commercial with Maria Sharapova promoting the use of Head rackets for many techniques such as golf and ten-pin bowling.

In assessing Djokovic's 2011 season, Jimmy Connors said that Djokovic gives his opponents problems by playing "a little bit old-school, taking the ball earlier, catching the ball on the rise, (and) driving the ball flat." Connors adds that a lot of the topspin that Djokovic's opponents drive at him comes right into his zone, thus his ability to turn defense into offense well.

Coaching and personal team

In the period 2004 and 2005, Djokovic was coached by Dejan Petrovic. From fall 2005 until June 2006, he was coached by Riccardo Piatti, who divided his time between the 18-year-old and Ivan Ljubičić. Player and coach reportedly parted ways over the latter's refusal to work full-time with Djokovic.

From June 2006 until May 2017, Djokovic was coached by former professional Slovakian tennis player Marián Vajda. They met for the first time during that year's French Open, after which Vajda was hired to be the 19-year-old's coach. On occasion Djokovic employed additional coaches on a part-time basis: in 2007, during the spring hardcourt season, he worked with Australian doubles ace Mark Woodforde with specific emphasis on volleys and net play while from August 2009 until April 2010 American Todd Martin joined the coaching team, a period marked by his ill-fated attempt to change Djokovic's serve motion. From early 2007 until 2017, Djokovic worked with physiotherapist Miljan Amanović, who was previously employed by Red Star Belgrade, and NBA player Vladimir Radmanović.

From the fall of 2006, Djokovic had an Israeli fitness coach, Ronen Bega, but the two parted ways during the spring of 2009. Djokovic decided to make a change after identifying his conditioning as a weakness in his game following continual losses to Nadal. In April 2009, ahead of the Rome Masters, Djokovic hired Austrian Gebhard Phil-Gritsch (formerly worked with Thomas Muster) to join the team in fitness coach capacity.

In July 2010, before the Davis Cup clash away at Croatia, Djokovic made another addition to his team – Igor Četojević, a Serbian nutritionist and proponent of traditional medicine living in Cyprus, who influenced Djokovic's diet. A gluten-free diet appeared to have worked as Djokovic began feeling stronger, quicker, and much more fit. After Djokovic's Wimbledon win in July 2011, Četojević left the team.

After retiring from professional tennis in August 2011, Serbian player Dušan Vemić joined Djokovic's team as the assistant coach and hitting partner for Novak. The collaboration ended before the 2013 US Open.

Six-time major champion and former world No. 1 Boris Becker, who had mostly worked as a television pundit for BBC Sport and Sky Sports since retiring from playing in 1999, was announced as Djokovic's new head coach in December 2013. According to Djokovic, the Becker appointment was done with input from the player's existing head coach Marián Vajda who reportedly wanted to spend more time with his family and was looking to have his coaching workload somewhat reduced. For Becker, in addition to working alongside Vajda, the job entailed special emphasis on Grand Slam tournaments as Djokovic felt he missed out on winning a couple of majors over the previous two seasons due to a lack of mental edge in the final stages of those tournaments. Becker's first tournament coaching Djokovic was the 2014 Australian Open.

On 5 May 2017, Djokovic confirmed that he had come to a mutual agreement to terminate his coaching relationship with Vajda, as well as Phil-Gritsch and Amanović. In a statement on his website, Djokovic cited the reasons for the personnel shakeup: "Novak and the team members decided to part ways after a detailed analysis of the game, achieved results in the previous period, and also after discussing private plans of each team member. Despite the fantastic cooperation so far, Djokovic felt he needed to make a change, and to introduce new energy in order to raise his level of play."

Djokovic reunited with Marián Vajda in April 2018 for the Monte Carlo Masters. On 30 June 2019, Djokovic confirmed that he also added former world No. 2 and Wimbledon champion Goran Ivanišević to his coaching team.

In early March 2022 both Djokovic and Vajda announced that Vajda would no longer coach Djokovic and that it was an amicable and mutual decision. Vajda promised to remain his ‘biggest support’ on and off the court. Djokovic said on Twitter "What a journey Marian. 15 years!"

Off the court

Philanthropy

In 2007, Djokovic founded the Novak Djokovic Foundation. The organization's mission is to help children from disadvantaged communities grow up and develop in stimulating and safe environments. The foundation partnered with the World Bank in August 2015 to promote early childhood education in Serbia. His foundation has built 50 schools as of April 2022 and are building their 51st, and supported more than 20,800 children and over a thousand families.

He participated in charity matches to raise funds for the reconstruction of the Avala Tower, as well as to aid victims of the 2010 Haiti earthquake and 2010–11 Queensland floods. Starting in 2007, he has established a tradition of hosting and socializing with hundreds of Kosovo Serb children during Davis Cup matches organized in Serbia. Djokovic was selected as the 2012 Arthur Ashe Humanitarian of the Year, for his contributions through the foundation, his role as a UNICEF national ambassador and other charitable projects. In August 2015, he was appointed a UNICEF Goodwill Ambassador.

During the 2014 Balkans floods, he sparked worldwide financial and media support for victims in Bosnia and Herzegovina, Croatia and Serbia. After winning the 2014 Rome Masters, Djokovic donated his prize money to the flood victims in Serbia, while his foundation collected another $600,000. Following his 2016 Australian Open victory, Djokovic donated $20,000 to Melbourne City Mission's early childhood education programm to help disadvantaged children. After the COVID-19 pandemic spread to Serbia in March 2020, he and his wife announced that they will donate €1 million for the purchase of ventilators and medical equipment to support hospitals and other medical institutions. He also made a donation to Bergamo, Italy‚ one of the worst-affected Italian provinces, as well as to Novi Pazar, Serbia and North Mitrovica, Serbia.

Sponsorships and business ventures
Djokovic endorses Serbian telecommunications company Telekom Srbija and German nutritional supplement brand FitLine.

On turning professional in 2003, Djokovic began wearing Adidas clothing. At the end of 2009, Djokovic signed a 10-year deal with the Italian clothing company Sergio Tacchini after Adidas refused to extend his clothing contract (choosing instead to sign Andy Murray). Tacchini doesn't make shoes so Djokovic continued with Adidas as his choice of footwear. His sponsorship contract with Tacchini was incentive-heavy, and Djokovic's disproportionate success and dominance in 2011 caused the company to fall behind on bonus payments, leading to the termination of the sponsorship contract.

From 2011, Djokovic began to wear custom Red and Blue Adidas Barricade 6.0's shoes, referring to the colours of the Serbian national flag. By April 2012, the Tacchini deal had fallen first short and then apart. At that point, he was set to join forces with Nike, Inc., but instead, on 23 May 2012, Uniqlo appointed Djokovic as its global brand ambassador. The five-year sponsorship, reportedly worth €8 million per year, began on 27 May 2012 in Paris' French Open tennis tournament. A year later, Djokovic's long-term footwear deal with Adidas was announced ahead of 2013 French Open.

In August 2011, Djokovic became the brand ambassador of Swiss watch manufacturer Audemars Piguet. Less than a month later, Djokovic signed a sponsorship deal with German car company Mercedes-Benz. In March 2012, Djokovic was announced by Bombardier Aerospace as its latest Learjet brand ambassador, thus joining the likes of actor and pilot John Travolta, architect Frank Gehry, maestro Valery Gergiev, and classical pianist Lang Lang. From January 2014 Djokovic has been endorsing French car manufacturer Peugeot. At the same time he entered into an endorsement deal with Japanese watch manufacturer Seiko, having just ended his affiliation with their rivals Audemars Piguet. In early 2015, ahead of the Australian Open, Djokovic teamed up with Australian banking corporation ANZ for a social media campaign to raise money for local communities across the Asia Pacific region. At the same time his partnership with Jacob's Creek, an Australian wine brand owned by Orlando Wines, was announced in regards to the production and distribution of 'Made By' film series, a documentary style content meant to "show a side of Novak not seen before as he recounts never before told life stories from Belgrade, Serbia, celebrating what has made him the champion he is today".

Since 2004, the business end of Djokovic's career has been handled by Israeli managers Amit Naor (former pro tennis player turned sports agent) and Allon Khakshouri, a duo which also had Marat Safin and Dinara Safina as its clients. In June 2008, after the duo entered into a partnership with CAA Sports, the sports division of Hollywood talent firm Creative Artists Agency, meaning that the famous company started representing tennis players for the first time, Djokovic formally signed with CAA Sports. After Djokovic's contract with CAA Sports expired during summer 2012, he decided to switch representation, announcing IMG Worldwide as his new representatives in December 2012.

On 22 May 2017, Djokovic was unveiled as a brand ambassador of Lacoste after a five-year partnership with Uniqlo.

During the 2021 US Open, some people in Djokovic's player box wore hats and shirts bearing the logo of Raiffeisen Bank International, the central back of one of the two largest banking cooperatives in Austria. In April 2021, Djokovic became a brand ambassador for RBI and its subsidiaries in Central and Eastern Europe. The bank will help to support Djokovic's tennis academy in Belgrade. Djokovic did not wear the RBI logo, but he did wear on his shirt the logo of UKG, an American workforce management and human resource management company. People in his box wore the logo on hats as well. UKG lists Djokovic as one of their sponsored athletes.

Investments
In 2005, as Djokovic moved up the tennis rankings, he began venturing into the business world. Most of his activities in the business arena have been channeled through Family Sport, a legal entity in Serbia established and run by members of his immediate family. Registered as a limited liability company, Family Sport initially focused on hospitality, specifically the restaurant business, by launching Novak Café & Restaurant, a franchise developed on the theme of Djokovic's tennis success. Over time, the company, whose day-to-day operations are mostly handled by Novak's father Srdjan and uncle Goran, expanded its activities into real estate, sports/entertainment event organization, and sports apparel distribution.

The company launched Novak Café & Restaurant in 2008 in the Belgrade municipality of Novi Beograd, the flagship location in a franchised chain of theme café-restaurants. During 2009, two more locations were added—one in Kragujevac and the other in Belgrade, the city's second, in September at the neighbourhood of Dorćol overlooking the playing courts of Serbia Open whose inaugural edition took place several months earlier. On 16 December 2011 a location in Novi Sad was opened, however, it operated just over three years before closing in late March 2015. Banja Luka in neighbouring Bosnia got its Novak Café & Restaurant location on 16 October 2015 within Hotel Trešnja on Banj hill.

In 2009, the company bought a 250-series ATP tournament known as the Dutch Open and moved it to Serbia where it was renamed the Serbia Open. With the help of Belgrade city authorities, the tournament's inaugural edition was held in May 2009 at the city-owned "Milan Gale Muškatirović" courts, located at an attractive spot in Dorćol neighbourhood. The tournament folded in 2012 after four editions and its place in the ATP calendar got taken over by the Düsseldorf Open.

In May 2015, right after winning his fourth Rome Masters title, Djokovic launched a line of nutritional food products, called Djokolife. On 10 April 2016, while in town for the Monte-Carlo Masters, Djokovic opened a vegan restaurant called Eqvita in Monte Carlo. The restaurant reportedly closed in March 2019.

Djokovic has 80% stake in biotech firm QuantBioRes which claims to be developing a drug to treat patients who have contracted COVID-19. Their research is based on electromagnetic frequency; one biomedical scientist likened it to homeopathy and argued that it "does not reflect a contemporary understanding of how biochemistry works", while Peter Collignon commented that their website "describes a way of finding a new molecule without providing any evidence of success".

Professional Tennis Players Association
In August 2020, Djokovic resigned from the Players Council of the Association of Tennis Professionals and formed the Professional Tennis Players Association (PTPA) with Vasek Pospisil. The pair will serve as co-presidents of the new organisation to promote the interests of male and female tennis players above a ranking of 500 in singles and 200 in doubles.

In popular culture
Throughout the latter part of the 2007 season, most notably before Wimbledon and during US Open, his comedic impressions of fellow contemporary tennis players received much media play. It began when a BBC camera crew recorded some footage of the twenty-year-old impersonating Maria Sharapova, Rafael Nadal, Goran Ivanišević, and Lleyton Hewitt on a practice court at London's Queen's Club Championships just before Wimbledon. The material — consisting of Djokovic imitating the said players by exaggerating their trademark physical gestures or nervous tics for the entertainment of his coaching team Marián Vajda and Mark Woodforde — aired during BBC's coverage of the tournament and subsequently became popular online. Two months later at the US Open, a phone video shot by Argentine players of Djokovic doing locker room impressions of Andy Roddick, Roger Federer, Filippo Volandri, Nadal, etc. made its way online, becoming viral. A few days later, after beating Carlos Moyá in the quarterfinals, USA Network's on-court interviewer Michael Barkann asked Djokovic to perform some impressions and the player obliged by doing Sharapova and Nadal to the delight of the crowd.

In addition to Novak, the national surge in the popularity of tennis was also inspired by three other up-and-coming young players: twenty-year-old Ana Ivanovic, twenty-two-year-old Jelena Janković, and twenty-three-year-old Janko Tipsarević as evidenced in early December 2007 when a sports-entertainment show named NAJJ Srbije (The Best of Serbia), put together in honour of the four players' respective successes in the 2007 season, drew a capacity crowd to Belgrade's Kombank Arena. In May 2008, he was a special guest during the first semi-final of the Eurovision Song Contest, held in Belgrade that year. He threw a big tennis ball into the crowd, announcing the start of the voting and together with one of the show's co-presenters, Željko Joksimović, Djokovic sang Đorđe Marjanović's song "Beograde".

Throughout late April and early May 2009, during ATP Master Series tournaments in Rome and Madrid, respectively, the Serb was a guest on the Fiorello Show on Sky Uno hosted by Italian comedian Rosario Fiorello followed by an appearance on Pablo Motos' show El Hormiguero.

Djokovic is also featured in the music video for the song "Hello" by Martin Solveig and Dragonette. The video, filmed at Stade Roland Garros, shows Solveig facing off against Bob Sinclar, another DJ, in a tennis match. When the referee calls a crucial ball "Out", Djokovic enters the arena and convinces the referee otherwise. In 2010, the Serbian blues-rock band Zona B recorded the song "The Joker", dedicating it to Djokovic.

On 25 June 2011, at the Serbian National Defense Council's seventieth congress in Chicago, Djokovic was unanimously awarded the Order of Serbian National Defense in America I class – the highest decoration of the SND. The order was given to the twenty-four-year-old for his merits on the international sports scene and his contributions to the reputation of Serbs and Serbia around the world. The day after winning his first Wimbledon title and reaching the No. 1 ranking for the first time in his career, Djokovic went home to Belgrade for a homecoming celebration in front of the Serbian National Assembly, an event attended by close to 100,000 people.

On 28 November 2011, after returning from London where he finished early due to failing to progress out of his round-robin group, Djokovic visited his childhood tennis coach Jelena Genčić at her Belgrade home, bringing the Wimbledon trophy along. The meeting, reportedly their first in more than four years, was recorded by two television crews – a Serbian one shooting for Aleksandar Gajšek's show Agape on Studio B television and an American one from CBS television network filming material for Djokovic's upcoming piece on 60 Minutes. The next day, 29 November 2011, on invitation from film producer Avi Lerner, Djokovic was part of the high-budget Hollywood movie production The Expendables 2 in a cameo playing himself that was shot in a warehouse in the Bulgarian capital of Sofia. However, his bit part was later cut out of the final version of the movie.

In March 2012, he was profiled on the CBS show 60 Minutes by their correspondent Bob Simon. He was named amongst the 100 most influential people of 2012 by TIME magazine.

Djokovic has been a guest on late-night talk shows, such as The Tonight Show with Jay Leno, Veče sa Ivanom Ivanovićem, Conan, Late Night with Jimmy Fallon, Late Show with David Letterman, The Late Show with Stephen Colbert,  The Jonathan Ross Show and The Ellen DeGeneres Show.

In April 2021, a team of Balkan biospeleologists named a recently discovered freshwater snail species Travunijana djokovici after Djokovic.

In 2022, a book titled Facing Novak Djokovic, a compilation of interviews with ATP players who described in detail what it's like to compete against Djokovic, was published.

In 2022, Nikola Vesović, a research associate at the University of Belgrade, announced that a new species of beetle in the genus Duvalius recently discovered near the town of Ljubovija, Serbia, had been named Duvalius djokovici after Djokovic.

Views on diet, medicine and science
Since 2010, he has been connected with the nutritionist Igor Četojević who additionally focuses on Chinese medicine and performs acupuncture. He allegedly discovered that Djokovic suffers from gluten intolerance, using applied kinesiology, and that he should not eat gluten, removing it from his diet. He eventually settled on a vegan diet, while later sometimes eating fish. He also claims this vegan, plant-based diet cured his persistent allergies and mild asthma. The gluten-free diet has been credited for improving his endurance on the court and playing a role in his subsequent success.

Following his elbow surgery in 2018, he stated that he "cried for three days" after it, feeling guilty, because he was "not a fan of surgeries or medications" and wanted "to be as natural as possible". He further stated that his belief that human "bodies are self-healing mechanisms".

In his 2013 autobiography, Serve to Win, he wrote of a "researcher" who directed "anger, fear, hostility" at a glass of water, which turned "slightly green" after a few days, while also directing "love, joy" at another glass of water, which remained "bright and crystal clear" in the same period. In 2020, Djokovic spoke of his knowledge of "some people" using "prayer" and "gratitude" to "turn the most toxic food, or maybe most polluted water into the most healing water." He also said that "scientists [have] proven" that "molecules in the water react to our emotions" and speech. Such claims are scientifically dubious, and generally regarded as superstitious beliefs.

Opposition to COVID-19 vaccine 

During the ATP Tour's shutdown due to the COVID-19 pandemic, in a Facebook live stream with other Serbian athletes hosted in April 2020, Djokovic indicated he opposes vaccination and would not be forced to take a Covid vaccine just to be able to return to the Тour. He later clarified his remarks by stating that he is not against all kinds of vaccines, but that he is against forced vaccination. He added that he was extremely careful about what he puts into his body.

Djokovic's views came under increased scrutiny in late 2021, in the run-up to the 2022 Australian Open, after comments made by Australian government officials indicated that tennis players would need to be vaccinated to enter the tournament. Prior to the tournament, Djokovic had refused to state publicly whether he was vaccinated or not, but had made comments stating his concern over the possibility of a hotel quarantine in Australia. However, while being interviewed by the Australian Border Force in January 2022, Djokovic confirmed to the officer interviewing him that he was unvaccinated.

Several commentators feel that Djokovic's stance against the COVID-19 vaccine could damage his placement among the all-time great tennis players as he would not be able to participate in the major tournaments where vaccination is required for entry while others have applauded his view of having a choice. He was unable to play the 2022 Australian Open, where he was the defending champion and the main favourite to win. Shortly thereafter, he lost the No 1 ranking he had held for a record 373 weeks. Due to the federal government's vaccination policy for non-US citizens, Djokovic was unable to enter the United States to play the 2022 US Open, another major tournament he was the favorite to win.

In an interview with the BBC on 15 February 2022, a few weeks after the tournament, Djokovic stated he does not associate with the wider anti-vax movement. However, he believes in personal freedom of choice and supports an individual's right to choose whether or not they receive a vaccine. He re-affirmed sticking to his principles and refusal to receive a vaccine, saying that he would be willing to forego entry into tournaments which are held in countries mandating the vaccine even if it cost him his career records and placement among the all-time great players.

Faith and religious beliefs
Djokovic is a member of the Serbian Orthodox Church. On 28 April 2011, Patriarch Irinej of Serbia awarded Djokovic the Order of St. Sava I class, the highest decoration of the Serbian Orthodox Church, for his contributions to monasteries of the Serbian Orthodox Church in Kosovo and charitable work in Serbia. He has said that he admired and held in high regard Bishop Amfilohije, who played a key part in helping him through a tough time during the Yugoslav Wars.

Djokovic has been reported to meditate for up to an hour a day at the Buddhist Buddhapadipa Temple in Wimbledon as he appreciates the natural setting and serenity, and is close to monks in the complex. He has spoken of the positive power of meditation. He is frequent visitor of Bosnian town of Visoko and its park that is host to several meditation platforms.

Support of sport and sportspeople
Djokovic is a fan of Serbian football club Red Star, Italian club Milan, and Portuguese club Benfica, as well as Serbian basketball club Red Star. He has also shown public support for Croatia at the 2018 FIFA World Cup and when faced with criticism from some within his native country of Serbia, Djokovic replied that "sports have their 'universal language,' they erase boundaries between people, [and] overcome differences in religion, race and nationality." Djokovic has expressed admiration for Croatian football player Luka Modrić, who plays for Real Madrid. He is good friends with former Serbian tennis player Ana Ivanovic, whom he has known since the two were children growing up in Serbia.

Djokovic is a member of the "Champions for Peace" club, a group of famous elite athletes committed to serving peace in the world through sport. It was created by Peace and Sport, a Monaco-based international organization.

Career statistics

Grand Slam tournament performance timeline

Current through the 2023 Australian Open.

Grand Slam tournament finals: 33 (22 titles, 11 runner-ups)

Year–End Championships performance timeline

Year–End Championship finals: 8 (6 titles, 2 runner-ups)

Records

All-time records

Open Era records 
 These records were attained in the Open Era of tennis and in ATP Masters series since 1990.
 Records in bold indicate peerless achievements.

Professional awards
 ITF World Champion (7): 2011, 2012, 2013, 2014, 2015, 2018, 2021.
 ATP Player of the Year (7): 2011, 2012, 2014, 2015, 2018, 2020, 2021.

See also

 2012 Summer Olympics Parade of Nations
 All-time tennis records – men's singles
 ATP Awards
 ATP World Tour records (since 1990)
 List of ATP number 1 ranked singles tennis players (since 1973)
 Top ten ranked male tennis players
 List of career achievements by Novak Djokovic
 List of Grand Slam men's singles champions
 List of UNICEF Goodwill Ambassadors
 Open Era tennis records – men's singles (since 1968)
 Tennis Masters Series records and statistics
 Tennis tournament records and statistics
 World number 1 ranked male tennis players (all time, based on recognized tennis authorities)
 Sports in Serbia

Explanatory notes

References

Further reading

External links

 
 
 
 
 
 
 Novak Djokovic Foundation
 Novak Djokovic v Minister for Home Affairs docket MLG35/2022 at the Federal Circuit and Family Court of Australia
 Djokovic v Minister for Immigration at the Federal Court of Australia

 
1987 births
Living people
ATP number 1 ranked singles tennis players
Australian Open (tennis) champions
French Open champions
Wimbledon champions
US Open (tennis) champions
Eastern Orthodox Christians from Serbia
Expatriate sportspeople in Monaco
Grand Crosses of the Order of St. Sava
Grand Slam (tennis) champions in men's singles
Hopman Cup competitors
ITF World Champions
Laureus World Sports Awards winners
Olympic bronze medalists for Serbia
Olympic medalists in tennis
Olympic tennis players of Serbia
Medalists at the 2008 Summer Olympics
Tennis players at the 2008 Summer Olympics
Tennis players at the 2012 Summer Olympics
Tennis players at the 2016 Summer Olympics
Tennis players at the 2020 Summer Olympics
Members of the Serbian Orthodox Church
People deported from Australia
Prisoners and detainees of Australia
Serbia and Montenegro male tennis players
Serbian expatriate sportspeople in Germany
Serbian expatriate sportspeople in Monaco
Serbian male tennis players
Sport in Serbia and Montenegro
Sport in Serbia
Sports world record holders
Tennis players from Belgrade
Tennis in Serbia and Montenegro
Tennis in Serbia
UNICEF Goodwill Ambassadors